Antisemitism in Chile started in early Chilean history during Spanish colonization and settlement. Now on the decline, Antisemitism has resurfaced throughout the country's history to include the 20th century Nazism in Chilean cities with German heritage. Chileans today have a positive view of the country's estimated 32,000 Jews or less than 1% of the population.

History of Judaism in Chile

Jewish presence in Chile is as old as the history of that country. Over time, Chile has received several contingents of Jewish immigrants. Currently, the Jewish community in Chile comes mainly from the migrations occurred in the 19th and 20th centuries, mostly of Ashkenazi background.
Chile is home to the third-largest Jewish community in South America.

Spanish colonization and settlement 
The first Jews arrived in Chile with the Spanish conquistadors. These were Jewish converts to Catholicism because, at the time of the Inquisition, had to hide their Jewish origin living. Most of this immigration occurred in the early years of the conquest, fleeing religious persecution in Spain, since in the Americas is not yet the court of the Inquisition installed.  Diego García de Cáceres, faithful friend and executor of the founder of Santiago, Pedro de Valdivia, was one of them.

In colonial times, the most prominent Jewish character in Chile was the surgeon Francisco Maldonado da Silva, one of the first directors of the San Juan de Dios Hospital. Maldonado da Silva was an Argentine Jew born in San Miguel de Tucumán into a Sephardic family from Portugal. He was accused to the Tribunal of the Inquisition by her sisters, devout Christians, from attempting to convert them to Judaism. Maldonado declared openly Jew, earning him the conviction to be burned alive in 1639. According to a 2010 book, he was imprisoned because he tried to convert his two sisters, who had converted to Catholicism, and they denounced him.

Jewish immigration in the 19th century 
From 1840, decades after the abolition of the Inquisition in Chile, began the Jewish immigration to the country. The first Jews who arrived in Valparaíso were from Europe, especially from Germany and France. One of them, Manuel de Lima y Sola, was a man who became one of the founding members of the Fire Department of Valparaíso in 1851 and one of the founders of the Chilean freemasonry to create the first Masonic lodge, the "Unión Fraternal" two years later.

Antisemitism from the Inquisition till the 20th century
Between the Spanish people which arrived to Chile during the Inquisition were Jews which had been sent away from their home land. The inquisition has been active in Chile until 1813. In that period, many Jews were executed. One of them was Francisco Maldonado De-Silva, a doctor who declared in public about his Jewish religion, and was executed only because of that. De-Silva's life story was published in the book “la gesta marrano”. With Chile's independence, Jewish prayers were allowed in public only in 1856. The first official Jewish organization was established in 1909.

Nazism in Chile

Nazism in Chile has a long history dating back to the 1930s. Nazist cells are currently active in many Chilean cities, especially the capital, Santiago, and the southern cities with German heritage.

After the dissolution of the National Socialist Movement of Chile (MNSCH) in 1938, notable former members of MNSCH migrated into Partido Agrario Laborista (PAL), obtaining high charges. Not all former MNSCH members joined the PAL; some continued to form parties of the MNSCH line until 1952. A new old-school Nazi party was formed in 1964 by school teacher Franz Pfeiffer. Among the activities of this group were the organization of a Miss Nazi beauty contest and the formation of a Chilean branch of the Ku Klux Klan. The party disbanded in 1970. Pfeiffer attempted to restart it in 1983 in the wake of a wave of protest against the Pinochet Regime.

Historically Nazism had also detractors in Chile. Example of this is the telegram sent by Salvador Allende and other members of the Congress of Chile to Adolf Hitler after the Kristallnacht (1938) in which they denounced the persecution of Jews.

Even before the Nazi takeover of Germany in 1933 there was a German Chilean youth organization with strong Nazi influence. Nazi Germany pursued a policy of Nazification of the German Chilean community. These communities and their organizations were considered a cornerstone to extend the Nazi ideology across the world by Nazi Germany. It is widely known that albeit there were discrepancies most German Chileans were passive supporters of Nazi Germany. Nazism was widespread among the German Lutheran Church hierarchy in Chile. A local chapter of the Nazi Party was started in Chile.

While Nazi Germany did pursue a policy of nazification of overseas German communities the German community in Chile did not act as an extension of the German state to any significant degree.

References